The Château de Montségur (English: Castle of Montsegur;) is a former fortress near Montségur, a commune in the Ariège department in southern France. Its ruins are the site of a razed stronghold of the Cathars. The present fortress on the site, though described as one of the "Cathar castles," is actually of a later period.

Geography 
The ruins of Montségur are perched at a precarious  altitude in the south of France near the Pyrenees. The top of the ruin is reached by a path and is 170m above the road.

History 
The earliest signs of human settlement in the area date back to the Stone Age. Evidence of Roman occupation such as Roman currency and tools have also been found in and around the site. Its name comes from Latin , which evolved into  in Occitan, which means "safe hill". In the Middle Ages the Montsegur region was ruled by the Counts of Toulouse, the Viscounts of Carcassonne and finally the Counts of Foix. Little is known about the fortification until the time of the Albigensian Crusade.

Cathar castle 
In about 1204, Raymond de Péreille, one of the two lords of Montségur, the other being his cousin Pierre-Roger de Mirepoix, decided to rebuild the castle that had been in ruins for 40 years or more. Refortified, the castle became a center of Cathar activities, and home to Guilhabert de Castres, a Cathar theologian and bishop. In 1233 the site became "the seat and head" of the Cathar church. It has been estimated that the fortified site housed about 500 people when in 1241, Raymond VII besieged Montsegur without success. The murder of representatives of the inquisition by about fifty men from Montsegur and faidits at Avignonet on May 28, 1242, was the trigger for the final military expedition to conquer the castle, the siege of Montségur.

In 1242 Hugues de Arcis led the military command of about 10,000 royal troops against the castle that was held by about 100 fighters and was home to 211 Perfects (who were pacifists and did not fight) and civilian refugees. The siege lasted nine months, until in March 1244, the castle finally surrendered. Approximately 220 Cathars were burned en masse in a bonfire at the foot of the pog when they refused to renounce their faith. Those who renounced the Cathar faith were allowed to leave and the castle itself was destroyed.

In the days prior to the fall of the fortress, several Cathars allegedly slipped through the besiegers' lines. This led to legends that they escaped with a secret treasure or esoteric knowledge. In 1906, esoteric French writer Joséphin Péladan proposed that the treasure was really the Holy Grail, arguing that Montségur was the Munsalväsche (or Montsalvat) of Wolfram von Eschenbach's 13th-century Grail romance Parzival. This idea was followed and expanded upon by various later writers, especially in France, and has inspired legends, conspiracy theories, and fictional works associating the Cathars and Montségur with the Holy Grail.

The later fortress

The present fortress ruin at Montségur is not from the Cathar era. The original Cathar fortress of Montségur was entirely pulled down by the victorious royal forces after its capture in 1244. It was gradually rebuilt and upgraded over the next three centuries by royal forces. The current ruin so dramatically occupying the site, and featured in illustrations, is referred to by French archeologists as "Montsegur III" and is typical of post-medieval royal French defensive architecture of the 17th century. It is not "Montsegur II," the structure in which the Cathars lived and were besieged, of which few traces remain today.

Montségur's solar alignment characteristics, visible on the morning of the summer solstice in particular, are part of what set this castle apart as an architectural wonder. This often mentioned solar phenomenon, occurring in an alignment of two windows in the fortress wall, has been observed by hundreds of students, astronomers, spiritual pilgrims and locals alike who come to the chateau specifically to view it every year and has been recorded and included in the documentary "The Otherworld," (by Richard Stanley) in 2013.

The Groupe de Recherches Archéologiques de Montségur et Environs (GRAME) (Archeological Research Group of Montsegur and Vicinity), which conducted a 13-year archeological excavation of Montségur with minimal funds and the technology available at the time in 1964–76, concluded in its final report, which was not widely published, is not viewed as solid archeological research, and is hotly disputed by many, that:

There remains no trace within the present-day ruins, neither of the first fortress which was abandoned before the 13th century (Montsegur I), nor of the one which was built by Raymond de Péreille around 1210 (Montsegur II)..." (Il ne reste aucune trace dans les ruines actuelles ni du premier château qui était à l'abandon au début du XIIIe siècle (Montségur I), ni de celui que construisit Raimon de Pereilles vers 1210 (Montségur II)...)

This small quote is all that can be found of this study, and no other study has been done. Despite its questionable veracity and ethics, it has been repeated and quoted in virtually every document to be found on the subject.

The small ruins of the terraced dwellings, immediately outside the perimeter of the current fortress walls on the north-eastern flank are, however, confirmed to be traces of authentic former Cathar habitations.

Gallery

Media 
 Iron Maiden published a song titled "Montségur", about the Catholics' stakes of Cathars, on their 2003 album Dance of Death.
 German thrash metal band Paradox's album Heresy deals with the persecution of the Cathars.
 Belgian symphonic black metal band, Lemuria, also released a 2010 album, Chanson de la Croisade, dealing with Cathars persecution in the Albigensian Crusades.
 The Era albums allude to the history of the Cathars, and the first album mentions Montségur on its cover.
 In Peter Berling's pentalogy The Children of the Grail and in Julia Navarro's La sangre de los inocentes, the siege of Montségur is described.
 Maurice Magre's novels «The Blood of Toulouse» and «The Treasure of the Albigensians» center around the history of Catharism and the siege of Montségur.
 The  (1849–1856) series of historical novels by Eugène Sue, features a historical novel about the persecution of the Cathars at Montségur. This story was later translated into English as The Iron Pincers.
 In Dan McNeil's novel The Judas Apocalypse, set just after the landings at Normandy during the Second World War, a German archaeologist and a group of American soldiers go looking for the Cathar treasure that was removed from Montségur.
 Sylvie Miller & Philippe Ward's novel The Song of Montségur (2001) pits the Roman Catholic Church against an ancient secret society of Nazis looking for the Holy Grail in Montségur.
 Kathleen McGowan's novel "The Expected One" incorporates the story of the Siege of Montsegur in the telling of Cathar history.
 Robert Shea's 1986 novel, All Things Are Lights features the siege of Montségur as part of its narrative.
 Sophy Burnham's novel, The Treasure of Montségur (2003) focuses on the siege of the castle.
 Kate Mosse's novel, 'Labyrinth' (2005) also describes the besieging of the Cathars at Montségur and explains some aspects of the connection between the Cathars and the Grail legend.
 E. D. deBirmingham's novel, Siege Perilous, revolves around the Siege of Montsegur in a somewhat alternate/magical history.
 Richard Stanley's documentaries, The Secret Glory (2001) and The Otherworld (2013) detail the neo-Cathar revival of the nineteen twenties and thirties, its ramifications in the present day and the mythic connections between Montségur and the Grail.
 The Casket of Maria Medici, 1980, Detective film based on Cathar treasures legend.

See also 
 Albigensian Crusade
 Cathar castles
 Cathars
 Otto Rahn
 List of castles in France
 List of medieval bridges in France
 Communes of the Ariège department

References

External links 

 
 Photos of Montsegur
 Montsegur and the Cathar Heresy
 The paths of Cathars by the philosopher Yves Maris.
 The Trail of Gnosis by Judith Mann

Castles in Ariège
Monuments historiques of Ariège (department)
Catharism
Massacres in France